Least We Forget is a 1954 Soviet film directed by Leonid Lukov.

Plot 
The film is based on the real life story of Yaroslav Galan.

The film tells about the confrontation of the famous writer, poet and active propagandist of the Soviet government in Ukraine with an organized criminal group that defends and promotes the interests of the West.

Cast
 Sergey Bondarchuk as Aleksandr Yakovlevich Garmash  
 Lidiya Smirnova as Anna Dashenko 
 Olga Zhiznyeva as Yevdokina Sergeyevna Garmash 
 Yelena Gogoleva as Mariya Spiridonovna Bantysh  
 Nikolai Plotnikov as Vsevolod Yevgenevich Yarchuk  
 Aleksandr Khvylya as Leonid Gavrilovich Korshun 
 Valentina Ushakova as Galina Korshun  
 Vyacheslav Tikhonov as Rostislav Dankovich  
 Nikolay Kryuchkov as Rodion Yegorov
 Vera Orlova as Glasha
 Boris Tenin  as Maryan Maksimovich, investigator
 Georgi Yumatov as a student

References

External links 
 

1954 films
1950s Russian-language films
Soviet war films
1954 war films
Soviet black-and-white films
Gorky Film Studio films
Films about anti-fascism